O Concerto Acústico (The Acoustic Concert) is a live album and video album by Rui Veloso, released through EMI Portugal in 2003. The album was released on CD and DVD. It was recorded live at Duvideo Studios, except for "Presépio de Lata", "Cavaleiro Andante" and "Primeiro Beijo", which were recorded at the Belém Cultural Center in Lisbon in December 2002, and "Porto Sentido", which was recorded at the Porto Coliseum in February 2003.

Track listing

CD 
Disc 1Disc 2

DVD 

 "Fado do Ladrão Enamorado
 "A gente não lê"
 "Bairro do Oriente"
 "Saiu para a Rua"
 "Nunca me Esqueci de Ti"
 "Nativa"
 "Sayago Blues"
 "Os Velhos do Jardim"
 "Todo o Tempo do Mundo"
 "Porto Covo"
 "O Prometido é Devido"
 "Jura"
 "Dia de passeio"
 "Lado lunar"
 "Não me Mintas"
 "Chico Fininho"
 "Não há Estrelas no Céu"
 "A Paixão"

References

External links
O Concerto Acústico at Rate Your Music
O Concerto Acústico at moo.pt 

2003 live albums
Rui Veloso albums